Laya, Bhutan  is a town in Laya Gewog in Gasa District in northwestern Bhutan. It is inhabited by the indigenous Layap people, and is the highest settlement in the country at 3,820 meters (12,533 feet) above sea level.

See also
List of highest towns by country

References

External links
Satellite map at Maplandia.com

Populated places in Bhutan